On June 8, 1950, the United States government approved Public Law 600, authorizing Puerto Rico to draft its own constitution in 1951. The Constitutional Assembly or Constitutional Convention of Puerto Rico met for a period of several months between 1951 and 1952 in which the document was written. The framers had to follow only two basic requirements established under Public Law 600. The first was the document must establish a republican form of government for the island. The second was the inclusion of a Bill of Rights.

The Constitution of Puerto Rico renamed the body politic until then known as the "People of Puerto Rico", and henceforth known as the "Commonwealth of Puerto Rico" (Estado Libre Asociado).

Members of the Constitutional Assembly

Committees
Ten permanent committees and their officers and members were designated by the body's president, Antonio Fernós Isern, during the 25 September 1951 session, which was followed by the naming of additional delegates and several substations on 27 September. All presidents, vice presidents and secretaries were from the PPD. These committees were grouped by their purposes as follows:

Functions committees (3):
 Rules and Bylaw
 Accounting and Publications
 Scheduling
Constitutional committees (7):
 Preamble, Amendment and Ordinance Procedures
 Bill of Rights
 Legislative Branch
 Executive Branch
 Judicial Branch
 Transitory Provisions and General Affairs
 Drafting, Style and Enrolling

Notes

References

External links 

 Resolutions and Propositions of the Constitutional Assembly (in Spanish)
 Session Diary of the Constitutional Convention (in Spanish)
 Analyses of the Constitutional Convention (in Spanish)
 25 July 1952 Program of Events (in Spanish)
 Text of the Constitution sent by the Convention

Political history of Puerto Rico
+Puerto Rico
1951 conferences
1952 conferences